Charles McVeigh (1849 – date of death unknown) was an Irish nationalist politician and a Member of Parliament (MP) for East Donegal from 1906 to 1910.

He was elected unopposed as an Irish Parliamentary Party MP for East Donegal at the 1906 general election. He did not contest the January 1910 general election.

External links

1849 births
Year of death missing
Members of the Parliament of the United Kingdom for County Donegal constituencies (1801–1922)
UK MPs 1906–1910
People from County Donegal
Irish Parliamentary Party MPs